Obukhovo is a station on the Nevsko–Vasileostrovskaya Line of Saint Petersburg Metro, opened on July 10, 1981.

The station is named after the nearby factory, which hosted a rebellion in 1901.

External links
 
Saint Petersburg Metro stations
Railway stations in Russia opened in 1981
Railway stations located underground in Russia